WRFU may refer to:

 Wellington Rugby Football Union
 WRFU-LP, a low-power radio station (104.5 FM) licensed to Urbana, Illinois, United States